Weaver is an unincorporated community in Clark County, Illinois, United States. Weaver is located along U.S. Route 40 northeast of Marshall, between Pond Creek and Big Muddy River.

History 
The Weaver Coal and Coke Company dug a mine shaft in Weaver in September 1902.

After Colonel W. P. Rend of Chicago acquired property at Weaver in 1904, the village became known as Rendville. In 1909, a steel tipple, a hotel, school, and several homes were built. The village was home to a company store.

In 1921, the mine at Weaver was renamed Old Ben Twenty, as a result of the sale of the Rend properties to the Old Ben Coal Corporation, in 1921. The mine closed in 1927.

The village was abandoned in 1938.

References

Unincorporated communities in Clark County, Illinois
Unincorporated communities in Illinois